Gulabgarh Assembly constituency is one of the 87 constituencies in the Jammu and Kashmir Legislative Assembly of Jammu and Kashmir a northern union territory of India. Gulabgarh is also part of Udhampur Lok Sabha constituency.

Member of Legislative Assembly
 1962: 
 1967: Mohd. Ayub Khan, Indian National Congress
 1972: Mohd. Ayub Khan, Indian National Congress
 1977: Haji Buland Khan, Jammu & Kashmir National Conference
 1983: Haji Buland Khan, Jammu & Kashmir National Conference
 1987: Haji Buland Khan, Jammu & Kashmir National Conference
 1996: Abdul Ghani Malik, Janata Dal
 2002: Abdul Ghani Malik, Jammu & Kashmir National Conference
 2008: Abdul Ghani Malik, Jammu & Kashmir National Conference

Election results

2014

See also
 Kishtwar district
 List of constituencies of Jammu and Kashmir Legislative Assembly

References

Assembly constituencies of Jammu and Kashmir
Kishtwar district